Prunus verrucosa, called the warty cherry or rough-stoned cherry, is a species of cherry native to Central Asia, particularly Turkestan.

Description
Prunus verrucosa is a shrub reaching . The bark is grey, turning browner with age. The flowers are pink, and the dark red fruits, although small, are palatable when consumed fresh.

References

verrucosa
Flora of Central Asia